The 2008 Bayelsa State gubernatorial election occurred on May 24, 2008. Incumbent PDP Governor Timipre Sylva won re-election in the supplementary election, defeating AC candidate, Ebitimi Amgbare, to emerge winner. Sylva won in six LGAs of the state.

Timipre Sylva emerged winner in the PDP gubernatorial primary election. His running mate was Peremobowei Ebebi.

Electoral system
The Governor of Bayelsa State is elected using the plurality voting system.

Results
The two main contenders registered with the Independent National Electoral Commission to contest in the re-run election were PDP Governor Timipre Sylva, who won the contest by polling 538,204 votes, and AC's Ebitimi Amgbare, who follows closely with 26,635 votes. There were 588,399 valid votes altogether.

References 

Bayelsa State gubernatorial elections
Bayelsa State gubernatorial by-election
Bayelsa State
gubernatorial